Lynda Hale is a former England women's international footballer.  She represented the England women's national football team at senior international level and spent most of her career at  Southampton Women's F.C..

International career

Lynda Hale made her first appearance for England against Scotland on 18 November 1972, winning England's 3–2 victory. Hale scored twice against Scotland.

Honors
 Southampton
 FA Women's Cup: 1970–71, 1971–72, 1972–73, 1974–75, 1975–76, 1977–78, 1978–79

References

People from Southampton
Living people
Southampton Women's F.C. players
English women's footballers
Women's association football wingers
England women's international footballers
Year of birth missing (living people)